Austin Reed may refer to:

Austin Reed (American football), American football quarterback for Western Kentucky
Austin Reed (retailer), a British fashion retailer founded in 1900
Austin Reed (Days of Our Lives), a fictional character in the U.S. TV soap opera Days of our Lives
Austin Reed (author), author of the first prison memoir written by an African-American